Nina Repeta (born September 10, 1967) is an American actress best known for her role as Bessie Potter on the television drama Dawson's Creek, which aired from 1998 to 2003.

She attended East Carolina University with Kevin Williamson, the creator of Dawson's Creek and most of her credits are in productions shot, as Dawson's Creek was, in Wilmington, North Carolina. Among them are Divine Secrets of the Ya-Ya Sisterhood and Matlock. Her first screen appearance was in the 1994 film Radioland Murders.

In addition to acting, Repeta is a singer.

Family
Nina and her husband, camera operator Mike Repeta, had a son, actor Banks Repeta, in 2008.

Filmography

References

External links

Nina Repeta's Official Homepage

East Carolina University alumni
1967 births
Living people